The Lagunitas Formation is a geologic formation in Cuba. The open marine, fluvio-deltaic and lagoonal claystones, limestones and conglomerates preserve fossils dating back to the Early Miocene period. Among others, the fossil primate Paralouatta marianae, the largest primate of the Miocene New World, was found in the formation. Based on microfossils, the age has been determined as Burdigalian.

Description 
The youngest lithostratigraphic unit overlain by Lagunitas is the Oligocene Las Cuevas Formation in the type section. Lagunitas is in turn overlain by the Middle Miocene Güines Formation and younger sediments.

Regional correlation 
Partial temporal and lithological equivalents of the Lagunitas Formation situated elsewhere in Cuba include the Arabos, Paso Real, Rosario and Magantilla Formations. In Hispaniola, the formation can be roughly correlated in age and lithology
with the Maissade and Yanigua Formations. In Puerto Rico the most similar unit is the Cibao Formation.

Vertebrate fossil content 

 Hemipristis serra
 Imagocnus zazae
 Negaprion brevirostris
 Paralouatta marianae
 Sphyrna mokarran
 Zazamys veronicae
 Metaxytherium sp.
 Myliobatis sp.
 Odontoceti indet.
 Pelomedusoides indet.

See also 
 List of fossiliferous stratigraphic units in Cuba

References

Bibliography 
 
 
 

Geologic formations of Cuba
Neogene Cuba
Burdigalian
Hemingfordian
Paleontology in Cuba
Shale formations
Limestone formations
Conglomerate formations
Deltaic deposits
Fluvial deposits
Open marine deposits
Lagoonal deposits
Formation